Chestnut is a census-designated place in Aetna Township, Logan County, Illinois. As of the 2010 census, its population was 246. The community is located northwest across the railroad tracks along Illinois Route 54 at Dauphin Street. Its claim to fame, for the sake of town promotion, is that it is the geographic center of the state. A small monument to this effect has been erected in a park near the southwest corner of Melvin Street and East Olive street (in §34 T19N R1W). However, the exact center of Illinois is about eight miles southwest of Chestnut, and on the other side of the town of Mount Pulaski, at 89°18.4'W 40°0.8'N.

History
The town of Chestnut was laid out in 1872 by David Clark in conjunction with the directors of the then newly completed Gilman, Clinton, and Springfield (later the Springfield branch of the Illinois Central railroad). The land was surveyed on April 24 of that year by Thomas G. Gardner, county surveyor. Two years prior, a town had been laid out, platted, and surveyed on the same section by William M. Allen and S. Linn Beidler. A post office had been established there under the name of Allenville in honor of Mr. Allen. On the laying out of Chestnut, the town of Allenville was abandoned. Chestnut was named in honor of one of the directors of the Gilman, Clinton, and Springfield railroad. The Britton Brothers erected the first store, having moved the building from "Yankeetown," a few miles distant; Dement and Clark erected the second store. William H. Daniels soon after started a blacksmith shop, George Lakin a drug store, and I. J. Michener erected an elevator in 1873. Mr. Lakin was postmaster and Mr. Michener was the railroad agent. In 1876, fire consumed the store and stock of Britton Brothers, at a loss of $3,000. In 1877, Dement and Clark's store and stock burned at a loss of $5,000. On Jan. 24, 1905, the general store of Gobleman & Bapst was destroyed by fire at a loss of $10,000. A Methodist church was erected in the town in 1873. An effort to incorporate Chestnut as a village was defeated at a special election in 1898.

Demographics

Per the 2010 US Census, Chestnut had 246 people. Among non-Hispanics this includes 233 White, 1 Native American, 3 Asian, 2 of two or more races, and 7 Hispanic or Latino.

The population was spread out, with 72.0% over the age of 18 and 15.4% who were 65 years of age or older. The median age was 37.5 years. The gender ratio was 47.6% male and 52.4% female. Among 99 occupied households, 88 were owner-occupied and 11 were renter-occupied.

References

Census-designated places in Logan County, Illinois
Census-designated places in Illinois